Paulino Gomes Nguendelamba (born 4 April 1998), commonly known as Popó, is an Angolan footballer who currently plays as a forward for Cuando Cubango.

Career statistics

Club

Notes

International

References

1998 births
Living people
Angolan footballers
Angola international footballers
Association football forwards
C.R.D. Libolo players
Progresso Associação do Sambizanga players
People from Benguela